Lillian Briggs ( Biggs; June 3, 1932  April 11, 1998) was an American rock 'n roll performer and musician.

Briggs was the first woman to achieve star status at the dawn of rock 'n roll in the early 1950s; soon after embarking upon her career, as she toured Australia with Nat King Cole in early 1956, she began being billed as "The Queen of Rock and Roll".  This was during the same period that the media began referring to Elvis Presley as the "King" of the new musical genre.

Biography

Early life
Born Lillian Biggs, she was raised in Allentown, Pennsylvania. Her musical career began at Allentown Central Catholic High School, where she said she took up the trombone and joined the school's band so she could attend football games for free. 

In the early 1950s, she worked for 14 months as a laundry truck driver in Catasauqua, Pennsylvania and later as a welder to support herself and finance The Downbeats, a band she formed that drew audiences both on live radio and at public venues in the Allentown area.

Career
In 1953, she joined Joy Cayler's All-Girl Orchestra as a singer and trombonist. A year later, appearing with Cayler's Orchestra at the Arcadia Ballroom in New York City, she performed a version of "Shake, Rattle and Roll" and was discovered by celebrity manager and talent scout Jack Petrill. As a preferred client of Petrill, her solo career was launched. Briggs toured at sock hops and nightclubs and did radio interviews, driving herself coast-to-coast from one engagement to the next in her white Cadillac convertible. Also in 1954, New York City disc jockey Alan Freed asked her to appear in his New York City stage shows, and her popularity in these shows led to her signing with Epic Records in 1954.

Her first single was 1955's "I Want You to Be My Baby"; the song sold over one million copies and hit No. 18 on the Billboard Hot 100. During the peak of her career (1954–64) she headlined at concert venues around the world, starred at the Las Vegas hotels and appeared on TV shows including Jack Paar's The Tonight Show, The Mike Douglas Show, American Bandstand and The Steve Allen Show, and won a part in the 1961 movie The Ladies Man. Lillian Briggs also recorded several songs on the soundtracks of three Hollywood films: The Fugitive Kind, Mr. Wonderful, and My Sister Eileen. In 1965, she appeared as a contestant on What's My Line?; at the time, she was giving trombone lessons to one of the show's panelists, Arlene Francis.

Lillian continued to record on Sunbeam Records, Paramount, Coral and Phillips while touring extensively until the early 1970s, when she relocated to Miami Beach to become a co-partner in Turnberry Isle, a luxury condominium resort. She was successful as a businesswoman. Her yacht, Monkey Business, was the boat upon which Gary Hart was photographed with Donna Rice, ending the former's presidential ambitions.

Death
Briggs died of lung cancer at her home in North Miami Beach, Florida on April 11, 1998. A comprehensive CD collection of her recordings was released posthumously in 2013 by Jasmine Records. In 2022, Briggs was posthumously given the International Trombone Association's Legacy Circle Award.

References

External links

1932 births
1998 deaths
20th-century American women singers
20th-century American singers
Allentown Central Catholic High School alumni
American rockabilly musicians
Apex Records artists
Country musicians from Pennsylvania
Deaths from lung cancer in Florida
Musicians from Allentown, Pennsylvania